The Battle of Burkersdorf may refer to:

 Battle of Burkersdorf (1762)
 Battle of Burkersdorf (1866)